One Glorious Night is a 1924 American silent drama film directed by Scott R. Dunlap and starring Elaine Hammerstein, Alan Roscoe, and Phyllis Haver.

Plot
As described in a film magazine review, Mary Stevens jilts Kenneth McLane and marries Chester James, a wealthy clubman. His mother lives with them and governs them as she controls the finances. She forbids Mary to have any children. After leaving the house with Mary, Chester returns to his home and deserts Mary. Mary has a child, which is adopted by Kenneth who has become wealthy. Years later he finds Mary and marries her.

Cast

References

Bibliography
 Bernard F. Dick. Columbia Pictures: Portrait of a Studio. University Press of Kentucky, 2015.

External links
 

1924 films
1924 drama films
1920s English-language films
American silent feature films
Silent American drama films
American black-and-white films
Films directed by Scott R. Dunlap
Columbia Pictures films
1920s American films